Tony McLoughlin (24 September 1946 – August 2012) was a footballer who played as a centre forward in the Football League for Wrexham and Chester. He also played for Wigan Athletic, scoring 34 goals for the club in the Northern Premier League. He later moved to America to play for Dallas Tornado in the North American Soccer League.

References

External links
Profile at 11v11.com
NASL statistics

Chester City F.C. players
1946 births
2012 deaths
Footballers from Liverpool
English footballers
English Football League players
Wrexham A.F.C. players
Wigan Athletic F.C. players
Dallas Tornado players
North American Soccer League (1968–1984) players
Association football midfielders
English expatriate sportspeople in the United States
Expatriate soccer players in the United States
English expatriate footballers